Carlo Brancaccio (Naples, March 6, 1861 – 1920)  was an Italian painter, active mainly in an Impressionist style.

Biography
While he initially had studied mathematics, he abandoned this to study painting by age 22 years. He was mentored by Eduardo Dalbono. His main subjects were city streets, sea- and landscapes, mostly vedute of Naples. At the 1887 Promotrice of Naples he displayed: Passe-partout, and many sketches of the city including the interiors of churches. In 1888, he displayed a large Seascape of Capri; in 1889, Toledo in the Rain; and in same year at the Brera Exposition in Milan, he exhibited the Piazza of the Carmine of Naples.

He won a gold medal at the Exhibition in Rome in 1893. He also painted Neapolitan genre subjects, including: Ore tristi (1898); Impressioni di Napoli (Berlin 1890); and Strada di Almalfi (1897).

Gallery

References

1861 births
1920 deaths
19th-century Italian painters
20th-century Italian painters
Italian vedutisti
Italian male painters
Painters from Naples
Orientalist painters
19th-century Italian male artists
20th-century Italian male artists